The Sand Hills are a low mountain range of the eastern Sacramento Valley, located in Yuba County, California.

References 

Hills of California
Mountain ranges of Yuba County, California
Geography of the Sacramento Valley
Mountain ranges of Northern California